Brysam Global Partners is a private equity firm that specializes in consumer financial services in emerging markets.  It was founded in January 2007 by Marjorie Magner and Robert Willumstad.

On September 7, 2007, Brysam completed a $228m (US) investment in Ixe Grupo Financiero, a leading financial institution based in Mexico City, representing 28% of shares then outstanding.

On February 21, 2008, Brysam acquired a 9.9% interest in Russian bank Vozrozhdenie Bank.  Founded in 1991, Vozrozhdenie ranks among the top thirty banks in Russia, with over one million individual accounts.  Terms of the investment were not disclosed.

On September 9, 2008, ex JP Morgan Chase director Robert I. Lipp joined the firm as senior partner.

On January 1, 2009, Brysam acquired 18.8% Interest In BCSC, a Colombian financial institution.

References

External links
Brysam Global Partners

Financial services companies established in 2007
Private equity firms of the United States